Drăganu is a commune in Argeș County, Muntenia, Romania. It is composed of four villages: Băcești, Drăganu-Olteni (the commune centre), Dumbrăvești and Prislopu Mare.

References

Communes in Argeș County
Localities in Muntenia